Henrik Zetterberg (born 1973) is Swedish professor of neurochemistry at the University of Gothenburg where he is the Head of the Department of Neurochemical pathophysiology and diagnostics. He is also the leader of the Fluid biomarkers for neurodegenerative diseases group at University College London. The groups works on developing early tests for dementia. 

His research includes development of methods for early diagnostics for frontotemporal dementia through use of biomarkers, In 2020 a team of scientists led by Zetterberg published results regarding a new diagnostic for Alzheimer's disease based on protein concentrations in cerebrospinal fluid, which is a colorless fluid surrounding the brain and spinal cord. The test was reported to have an accuracy of around 90% and could detect the disease about two decades before significant symptoms are present.

Early life and career 
Zetterberg was born 1973 and brought up in the Gothenburg archipelago, Sweden. He completed his doctoral thesis in 2003 on the subject of the Epstein–Barr virus. He performed postdoctoral research at Harvard using zebrafish as a model for alzheimer's disease. Zetterberg has worked together with Kaj Blennow, whom he met during his PhD, on many projects including coleading   the Clinical  Neurochemistry  Laboratory together with him.

References

Living people
1973 births
Alzheimer's disease researchers
Academic staff of the University of Gothenburg
Physicians from Gothenburg
Swedish neuroscientists